Rosa Frances Emily Swiney ( Biggs; 21 April 1847 – 3 May 1922) was an early British feminist, writer, and theosophist.

Biography

Rosa Frances Emily Biggs was born in Poona, India, but spent most of her childhood in Ireland. In 1871 she married Major John Swiney (1832–1918), and devoted herself to becoming a full-time wife and mother. Swiney relocated to Cheltenham, Gloucestershire in 1877, a place she described later in her life as "the town of no ideals", where her husband joined her ten years later.

Since 1890, Swiney was a feminist activist, lecturer, and writer in Cheltenham. She co-founded the Cheltenham Women's Suffrage Society (Cheltenham WSS) in 1896; was Vice President of the Cheltenham Food Reform and Health Association; and lectured in organisations such as the Higher Thought Centre in London, Theosophical lodges, and Ethical Societies. Swiney was a member of the Theosophical Society (TS), the Sociological Society, the National Union of Women Workers (NUWW), the Eugenics Education Society, the Secular Education League, the Woman's Freedom League (WFL), and the National Woman's Social and Political Union (WSPU), as well as of the council of the Woman's Branch of the International Neo-Malthusian League.

Swiney was personally connected to various prominent and important figures of her time, such as Charlotte Despard, Harriet McIlquham, Charlotte Stopes, Margaret Sibthorpe, Elizabeth Clarke Wolstenholme-Elmy, and Annie Besant.

Since 1910, her books were co-published by the League of Isis, which she founded in 1909. The League of Isis aimed to bring about "the betterment of the Race, by individual observance of the Natural Law of reproduction (…) for the building up of the Higher Self". This organisation, together with her writings, reflects a deep engagement in theosophical teachings: the belief in a spiritual evolution and in the Divine Mother (Isis), as well as the convincement that Theosophy can overcome the boundaries between science and religion.

Death
Swiney died on 2 May 1922, aged 75.

Theosophy, motherhood and feminism 

Contemporary conceptions of motherhood and race strongly influenced Frances Swiney, the theosophist, feminist, and eugenicist.

Like other feminists at that time, she reversed the negative connotations of womanhood and motherhood and used it for her own argumentation, to fight for women's enfranchisement. Swiney claimed justice for women as "aiders in creating the wealth of the nation and as mothers of the race".

Swiney's feminist emphasis on motherhood, race, and evolution also influenced her interpretations of Theosophy. This is the reason why Swiney focussed on one particular aspect of theosophical thought: the Divine Feminine, or the Divine Mother, as personated by the Goddess Isis, and her role in the cosmic process. Herein, Swiney's theosophical concepts differ from mainstream Theosophy. This is evidence for her own, personal, feminist agenda within an esoteric framework.The Mother, then, is the Supreme Unity, uniting all in Herself. It is not difficult why in the eternal sequence of things in evolution the human race is awakening to the truth of the Divine Feminine in the present stage of the world history. (…) Relatively speaking, the race, still in its immature youth, expelled the Mother from the nursery, and anarchy and chaos prevailed, (…). The evolved soul has always known that this intense craving for union once more with the Feminine Principle must be the first sign of the regenerate heart.For her, the Divine Mother was oneness of the sublime cause, and all emanation would derive from her and return to her in the end of the circled cosmic process:For the soul is the feminine creative principle in man (…). The Feminine is therefore the inner nature of man, and woman (…), the objective representative of the Divine Feminine.

Swiney's imperial context (personal and family connections to British India) influenced her perception and interpretation of Theosophy and, therefore, her theosophical feminism. Furthermore, Theosophy, and esotericism in general, were deeply embedded in the discourse of Britain's First Wave Feminism, as it is evident especially by the vast number of theosophical feminists.

Writings
The Plea of Disfranchised Women (Cheltenham: Shenton, 1896)
The Awakening of Women, or, Woman’s Part in Evolution (London: George Redway, 1899)
The Cosmic Procession or The Feminine Principle in Evolution (London: Ernest Bell, 1906)
The Bar of Isis (London: The Open Road Publishing, 1907)
The Mystery of the Circle and the Cross (London: Open Road Publ., 1908)
The Esoteric Teaching of the Gnostics (London: Yellon, Williams & Co., 1909)
Racial Poisons (Cheltenham: League of Isis, 1910–12)
Racial Problems (Cheltenham: League of Isis, 1910–14)
Woman and Natural Law (London: C.W. Daniel, 1912)
Responsibilities of Fatherhood (Cheltenham: League of Isis, 1912)
‘Our Indian Sisters’, Racial Pamphlets No. 12 (Cheltenham: League of Isis or the Law of the Mother, 1914)
The Ancient Road, or, The Development of the Soul (London: Bell and Sons,1918)

See also
List of suffragists and suffragettes

References

British feminists
1847 births
1922 deaths
British occultists
19th-century Anglo-Irish people
People from Cheltenham
Place of death missing
20th-century Anglo-Irish people